Harris County Public Library may refer to:

The Harris County Public Library in Texas
Harris County Public Library, a branch of the Troup-Harris Regional Library System